Kuntaur is a town located in central part of the Gambia.

According to the 2013 census, there are 3074 inhabitants. The town is the seat of the Kuntaur Local Government Area (the western half of the former Central River Division), which has a population of 98,966.

Geography
Kuntaur lies on the north bank of the Gambia River, about three kilometres south of Wassu and 13 kilometres north of Janjanbureh. The North Bank Road, an important highway crosses Wassu, where the well-known Wassu stone circles are located. The town is the seat of the eponymous Local Government Area, in the district of Niani.

Cultural sights
The Senegambian stone circles which are regarded as a place of worship among the Serer are not far from the area.

Economy and infrastructure
Located about 248 kilometres from the river mouth to the Atlantic Ocean, the town is the last inland port that can be navigated by large commercial ships. This port is a major transit point for peanuts and peanut related products.

References

Populated places in the Gambia
Central River Division
Local Government Areas of the Gambia